Stewart is an unincorporated community in Houston County, Tennessee, United States. Its ZIP code is 37175.

Notes

Unincorporated communities in Houston County, Tennessee
Unincorporated communities in Tennessee